Rhinusa antirrhini, known generally as toadflax seedhead weevil, is a species of true weevil in the family of beetles known as Curculionidae. Other common names include the toadflax capsule weevil and seed-gall weevil.

References

Further reading

External links

 
 

Curculioninae
Beetles described in 1825